The 1985–86 Copa del Rey was the 84th staging of the Copa del Rey, the annual domestic cup competition in the Spanish football. The tournament was attended by 142 teams from the main categories of Spaniard football.

The tournament began on 11 September 1985 and ended on 26 April 1986 with the final, held in Vicente Calderón Stadium in Madrid.

Real Zaragoza won their third title and got reedit the title after 20 years. The final ended with a 1–0 victory over Barcelona with a solitary goal from Rubén Sosa.

The defending champions, Atlético Madrid, were defeated 2–1 (on the aggregate score) by Barcelona in the quarter-finals.

Format 

 All rounds are played over two legs except the final which is played a single match in a neutral venue. The team that has the higher aggregate score over the two legs progresses to the next round.
 In case of a tie on aggregate, will play an extra time of 30 minutes, and if still tied, will be decided with a penalty shoot-outs.
 The teams that play European competitions are exempt until the round of 16 or when they are removed from the tournament.
 The winners of the competition will earn a place in the group stage of next season's UEFA Cup Winners' Cup, if they have not already qualified for European competition, if so then the runners-up will instead take this berth.

First round

Second round

Third round

Fourth round

Bracket

Round of 16 

|}

First leg

Second leg

Quarter-finals 

|}

First leg

Second leg

Semi-finals 

|}

First leg

Second leg

Final

References

External links 

  RSSSF
  Linguasport

Copa del Rey seasons
1985–86 in Spanish football cups